USS Salerno Bay (CVE-110) (ex-Winjah Bay) was a  laid down on 7 February 1944 by Seattle-Tacoma Shipbuilding Corporation, Tacoma, Washington; launched on 26 September 1944; sponsored by Mrs. Ward Gilbert; transferred to the Commercial Iron Works, Portland, Oregon, for completion on 29 September 1944; and commissioned on 19 May 1945, Captain W. C. Holt in command.

Service history

World War II
The sixth of the line of Commencement Bay-class escort carriers with improvements dictated by that class's operating experience, Salerno Bay embarked her first air group, MCVEG-5, at the end of June. With that group, comprising Marine Fighter Squadron 514 (VMF-514) and Marine Torpedo Bombing Squadron 144 (VMSB-144), she trained off southern California. Two days after Japan's mid-August capitulation, she sailed west with Composite Squadron 68 (VC-68) embarked as passengers. She conducted further training operations, including night qualification of her Marine air group, in Hawaiian waters, then continued west. On 21 September, she anchored in Buckner Bay, Okinawa. Later shifting to the Hagushi anchorage, she put to sea in early October to ride out a typhoon. On 12 October, she returned to Hagushi only to depart again on 14 October to support the mid-month occupation of Formosa by troops of the Chinese Army. From that island, the escort carrier headed east, to Saipan. She remained at Saipan for three weeks; then, detached from the 7th Fleet, she shifted to Guam; embarked veterans as passengers; and set a course for Pearl Harbor and San Diego. She arrived at the latter in early December. At mid-month, she proceeded to the Panama Canal Zone, whence she continued on to Norfolk, Virginia, arriving on 23 December.

Assigned to the Atlantic Fleet and engaged primarily in qualifying carrier pilots, Salerno Bay operated along the eastern seaboard and in the Caribbean into 1947. In the spring of that year, she was ordered inactivated; and, in June, she sailed north, from Norfolk to Boston, to prepare for decommissioning and mothballing.

Korean War
Decommissioned on 4 October, she remained in the reserve fleet until recommissioned on 20 June 1951. Shakedown training followed; and, in October, she commenced operations with Carrier Division 18. During November and early December, she conducted exercises off the Virginia Capes and in the Caribbean. On 18 December, she returned to Norfolk. On 7 January 1952, she again sailed south for operations in the Caribbean. Back at Norfolk in early February, she operated off Puerto Rico in March and off the Virginia and Carolina coasts from April to July. She then prepared for European deployment. On 26 August, she departed Norfolk; joined TF 173 en route; and, during September, participated in NATO exercises off Norway. In early October, she proceeded to Gibraltar, thence sailed into the Mediterranean for operations with the 6th Fleet. At the end of November, she retransited the Strait of Gibraltar; and, on 7 December, she arrived back at Norfolk to resume local, western Atlantic, and Caribbean exercises, which she continued into 1953.

In the spring of that year, as the war in Korea moved toward a truce, the CVE was again ordered inactivated. On 8 June, she returned to Boston, where she was decommissioned a second time on 16 February 1954. Reclassified AKV-10 in 1959, Salerno Bay remained in the Atlantic Reserve Fleet until struck from the Navy list on 1 June 1961. She was sold on 30 October to Revalorizacion de Materiales, S.A., through their agent Jacq. Pierot, Jr., and Sons, New York City, and removed from Naval custody on 14 December 1961.

References

External links
 Photo gallery at navsource.org

 

Commencement Bay-class escort carriers
World War II escort aircraft carriers of the United States
Ships built in Tacoma, Washington
1944 ships
Cold War escort carriers of the United States